The Land Settlement (Facilities) Act 1919 was a piece of legislation passed in the United Kingdom 
following World War I. The act allowed local governments (namely Counties) to provide smallholdings (farmland) to veterans of the war.  It eliminated the need for the recipient of the land to have experience or training in farming.

For example, Surrey County Council purchased more than 2,000 acres of land created small holdings for over 250 service people empowered by the Land Settlement (Facilities) Act 1919. None of them were women.

References

External links
Text of the act

Property law of the United Kingdom
1919 in the United Kingdom
United Kingdom Acts of Parliament 1919